John Cowan (November 12, 1847 – March 24, 1927) was a businessman and politician in Newfoundland. He represented Bonavista in the Newfoundland House of Assembly from 1897 to 1900 as a Conservative.

He was born in St. John's and was educated at the General Protestant Academy. He first worked as a draper, later working as a bookkeeper for several firms. He became manager at J. & W. Stewart's; when that company ceased to operate in Newfoundland, Cowan took over the business.

Cowan was a prominent member of the local freemason lodge. He married Eliza Julia Earle.

References 

Members of the Newfoundland and Labrador House of Assembly
1847 births
Year of death missing
Newfoundland Colony people
Businesspeople from St. John's, Newfoundland and Labrador
Politicians from St. John's, Newfoundland and Labrador